Raulino Galvao (born 30 September 1888, date of death unknown) was a German field hockey player. He competed in the men's tournament at the 1908 Summer Olympics.

References

External links
 

1888 births
Year of death missing
German male field hockey players
Olympic field hockey players of Germany
Field hockey players at the 1908 Summer Olympics
Field hockey players from Buenos Aires